Tiyakad or Kadang kadang is a Philippine racing game that uses bamboo stilts. In another variant, the players use coconut shells as slippers and use strings tied to said slippers to move forward.

References

Philippine games
Traditional games
Children's games